Evelyn Scott (born as Elsie Dunn January 17, 1893 – died August 3, 1963) was an American novelist, playwright and poet. A modernist and experimental writer, Scott "was a significant literary figure in the 1920s and 1930s, but she eventually sank into critical oblivion."

Personal life
She was born in Clarksville, Tennessee and spent her younger years in New Orleans, Louisiana. She later wrote about her childhood in Tennessee in her autobiographical Background in Tennessee.

Her first husband was Frederick Creighton Wellman. He was a married man when they met and dean of the School of Tropical Medicine at Tulane. Both Evelyn and her husband took on pseudonyms when they ran away to Brazil together in 1913. Frederick changed his name to Cyril Kay-Scott and Evelyn also took Scott as her surname. The two had a son together, Creighton, but were divorced in 1928. She also had an affair with Owen Merton, father of Thomas Merton.

Scott later married the English writer John Metcalfe in 1930.

Literary career
She sometimes wrote under the pseudonym Ernest Souza, and under her birth name, Elsie Dunn.

Bibliography

Fiction 
The Narrow House.  New York: Boni & Liveright, 1921
Narcissus.  New York: Harcourt Brace, 1922 (U.K. edition: Bewilderment.  London: Duckworth, 1922)
The Golden Door.  New York: Thomas Seltzer, 1925
Ideals: a Book of Farce and Comedy. New York: Boni & Liveright, 1927
Migrations: an Arabesque in Histories. New York: Boni & Liveright, 1927
The Wave.  New York: Jonathan Cape & Harrison Smith, 1929
Blue Rum (written under the pseudonym "Ernest Souza").  New York: Jonathan Cape & Harrison Smith, 1930
A Calendar of Sin: American Melodramas.  New York: Jonathan Cape & Harrison Smith, 1931
Eva Gay.  New York: Harrison Smith & Robert Haas, 1933
Breathe Upon These Slain.  New York: Scribners, 1934
Bread and a Sword.  New York: Scribners, 1937
The Shadow of the Hawk.  New York: Scribners, 1941

Poetry 
Precipitations.  New York: Nicholas L. Brown, 1920
The Winter Alone.  New York: Jonathan Cape & Harrison Smith, 1930
The Collected Poems of Evelyn Scott (ed. Caroline C. Maun).  Orono: National Poetry Foundation, University of Maine, 2005

Autobiography 
Escapade.  New York: Thomas Seltzer, 1923
Background in Tennessee.  New York: R. M. McBride, 1937

For children 
In the Endless Sands: a Christmas Book for Boys and Girls (with C. Kay-Scott).  New York: Henry Holt & Co., 1925
Witch Perkins: a Story of the Kentucky Hills.  New York: Henry Holt & Co., 1929
Billy the Maverick.  New York: Henry Holt & Co., 1934

Further reading 
Callard, D. A.  Pretty Good for a Woman: The Enigmas of Evelyn Scott.  New York: W. W. Norton & Co., 1985
White, Mary Wheeling.  Fighting the Current: The Life and Work of Evelyn Scott.  Baton Rouge: Louisiana State University Press, 1998
Scura, Dorothy McInnis and Jones, Paul C., eds.  Evelyn Scott: Recovering a Lost Modernist.  Knoxville: University of Tennessee Press, 2001
Tyrer, Pat.  Evelyn Scott's Contribution to American Literary Modernism, 1920-1940: A Study of Her Trilogy: The New Woman in the Narrow House, Narcissus, and The Golden Door.  Lewiston: Edwin Mellen Press, 2013

References

External links
 
 

Evelyn Scott Collection at the University of Tennessee, Knoxville
Evelyn Scott Collection at the Harry Ransom Center

20th-century American novelists
American women novelists
Pseudonymous women writers
1893 births
1963 deaths
Place of birth missing
Place of death missing
American women dramatists and playwrights
20th-century American women writers
20th-century American dramatists and playwrights
20th-century pseudonymous writers